The 2012 Women's Twenty20 Cup was the 4th cricket Women's Twenty20 Cup tournament. It took place in July and August, with 36 teams taking part: 33 county teams plus Wales, Ireland and the Netherlands. Sussex Women won the Twenty20 Cup, beating Berkshire Women in the final, achieving their first T20 title. The tournament ran alongside the 50-over 2012 Women's County Championship.

Competition format

Teams played matches within a series of regionalised divisions, with the winners of the top divisions progressing to semi-finals and a final. Matches were played using a Twenty20 format.

The divisions worked on a points system with positions within the divisions being based on the total points. Points were awarded as follows:

Win: 2 points. 
Tie: 1 points. 
Loss: 0 points.
Abandoned/Cancelled: 1 point.

Teams 
The 2012 Women's Twenty20 Cup was divided into three regions: Midlands & North, South and South & West. Each region was further divided into divisions: Midlands & North with four, South with three and South & West with two. Teams in each division played each other once, and then the top two played in a Division Final and bottom two in a 3rd-place play-off. The winners of each Division 1, and the best-performing second-place team, progressed to the semi-finals.

Midlands & North

South

South & West

Midlands & North

Division 1

Group stage

 Source: ECB Women's Twenty20 Cup

Final

Division 2

 Source: ECB Women's Twenty20 Cup

Division 3

 Source: ECB Women's Twenty20 Cup

Division 4

 Source: ECB Women's Twenty20 Cup

South

Division 1

Group stage

 Source: ECB Women's Twenty20 Cup

Final

Division 2

 Source: ECB Women's Twenty20 Cup

Division 3

 Source: ECB Women's Twenty20 Cup

South & West

Division 1

Group stage

 Source: ECB Women's Twenty20 Cup

Final

Division 2

 Source: ECB Women's Twenty20 Cup

Knock-Out Stage

Semi-finals

Third-place play-off

Final

Statistics

Most runs

Source: CricketArchive

Most wickets

Source: CricketArchive

Notes

References

Women's Twenty20 Cup
 
cricket